We the People is the seventh studio album by blues guitarist Guitar Shorty, released on compact disc on August 15, 2006. It was Shorty's second album with the Alligator Records label.

The album has been called "a timeless and completely current blues record." Reviewer Steve Leggett comments that "Shorty is a guitar player's guitar player, and this collection makes for a nice introduction to his studio style."

Track listing 
"We the People" (Guitar Shorty, Harms) — 4:20
"What Good Is Life?" ( Wyzard, Green, Guitar Shorty) — 4:04
"I Got Your Number" (Bob Halligan, Jr.) — 3:53
"Runaway Train" (Tommy McCoy) — 4:59
"Down That Road Again" (Guitar Shorty, Harms, Ross) — 4:57
"Fine Cadillac" (Grimaldi) — 5:51
"Can't Get Enough" (Wyzard) — 4:24
"A Hurt So Old" (Halligan) — 3:56
"Who Needs It?" (Williams) — 3:22
"Blues in My Blood" (Merv Goldsworthy) — 3:12
"Cost of Livin'" (Guitar Shorty, Wyzard) — 4:10
"Sonic Boom" (Harms) — 3:13

Personnel 
Guitar Shorty — guitar, vocals
Jake Andrews — rhythm guitar
Alvino Bennett — drums
Wyzard — bass, acoustic guitar
John Thomas — keyboards

Production:
James Bennett — assistant engineer
Brian Brinkerhoff — producer
Jerry "Wyzard" Seay - producer
Larry Goetz — engineer, mixing
Bruce Iglauer — mastering
Dan Monick — photography
Kevin Niemiec — package design
Dan Stout — mastering
Michael Trossman — logo

Reception 

AllMusic says that Shorty "radiates tremendous energy" and that "his guitar playing is rich, deep, and heavy as plutonium on these tracks." Reviewer Steve Leggett that the album has a nice balance between "hard rocking party numbers, straight out blues pieces, and strong political statement."

Charts

References

2006 albums
Guitar Shorty albums
Alligator Records albums